The Collegium of Estates (also College) was a Russian executive body (collegium), created in 1721. In 1782, it was announced that the College would be closing, but due to various disputes, the process of closing took another four years.

References
Readings of the Moscow Society for History and Antiquities
Ardashev NN, History of the patrimonial archive until 1812, Описание док-тов и бумаг МАМЮ, Vol. 5, M., 1888

Collegia of the Russian Empire
1782 disestablishments
1721 establishments in Russia